On the rocks is bartending terminology for a drink served over ice cubes.

On the Rocks may also refer to:

Literature
 On the Rocks: A Political Comedy, a 1932 play by George Bernard Shaw
 On the Rocks (2008 play), a play by Amy Rosenthal, directed by Clare Lizzimore
 Wally and Osborne, formerly On the Rocks, a webcomic by Tyler Martin

Music 
 On The Rocks, University of Oregon a cappella group founded by Peter Hollens
 On the Rocks (The Byron Band album)
 On the Rocks (Midland album), 2017
 "On the Rocks" (song), a 2014 song by Nicole Scherzinger
 "On the Rocks", a single by Grieves from the album Together/Apart
 "On the Rocks", a 1981 song by David Robinson
 "On the Rocks", a 1995 song by The Delta 72
 "On the Rocks", a 1982 song by Gillan 1982
 "On the Rocks", a 1958 song by The Ramrocks
 "On the Rocks", a 1981 song by Spookey
 "On the Rocks", a 1979 song by the Sutherland Brothers
 "On the Rocks", a 2014 song by The Rural Alberta Advantage

Television, film, and radio
 On the Rocks (American TV series), an American sitcom that aired from 1975 to 1976 on ABC
 On the Rocks (British TV series), a 1969 British television situation comedy series
 On the Rocks (film), an American comedy-drama film
 On the Rocks (XM), a radio station provided by XM Satellite Radio

See also
 Love on the Rocks (disambiguation)